The 2000 Race of a Thousand Years was an endurance race and the final round of the 2000 American Le Mans Series. It was run on the Adelaide Street Circuit in Australia on New Year's Eve, 31 December 2000. The race was run on the full 3.780 km (2.349 mi) Grand Prix circuit used by Formula One for the Australian Grand Prix between 1985–1995, rather than the shorter 3.219 km (2.001 mi) Supercars version of the circuit used since 1999. The Race of a Thousand Years was intended to be run for 1000 kilometres but was stopped short due to time constraints, two hours before midnight, after completing 850 kilometres.

Background
Like the 1999 Le Mans Fuji 1000 km, the Race of a Thousand Years was intended as a precursor to a planned Asia-Pacific Le Mans Series (APLMS) run by Don Panoz and the Professional Sports Car Racing body, just as the Silverstone and Nürburgring events earlier in the season were for the European Le Mans Series (ELMS).  After a small number of entrants for the European series in 2001, as well as a lack of entrants for a third Asian-Pacific exhibition event at the Sepang Circuit, the APLMS plans were cancelled.

The race was the final of twelve endurance sports car racing rounds of the 2000 American Le Mans Series and took place at the Adelaide Street Circuit on 31 December 2000. The event was the first in a nine-year contract, but was abandoned after only one. Over 135,000 fans attended the race meeting, with almost 70,000 of them in attendance on race day. Organisers expected around 200,000 people in attendance during the race weekend.

Race Summary
By completing the first 25 laps (and in the lead after having passed teammate Frank Biela on lap 17), Allan McNish became the 2000 American Le Mans Series LMP Drivers' Champion. McNish and teammate Rinaldo Capello completed 225 laps in their Audi Sport North America R8. Australian driver Brad Jones had also qualified the R8 but did not drive in the race. Jones, the team owner and lead driver of Audi's factory backed Super Touring team in Australia, was on stand-by for Scotsman McNish who had injured his back a few days before the race while stepping out of his kilt after a photo shoot and had spent the day before the race flat on his back in bed in a successful effort to be fit to race. The Audi team suffered a setback on the morning of the race when Capello crashed the R8 (painted in crocodile livery in honour of the host country Australia) into the tyre barriers on the outside of turn six. However the team were able to repair the car to allow McNish to start.

The GTS class was won by Olivier Beretta, Karl Wendlinger and Dominique Dupuy who piloted their Team Oreca Dodge Viper GTS-R (known as a Chrysler Viper in Australia) to 3rd outright, while finishing 5th outright were the GT class winners Dirk Müller and Lucas Luhr in their Dick Barbour Racing Porsche 911 GT3-R.

McNish (Audi), Portuguese driver Ni Amorim (Viper) and German Luhr (Porsche) set the fastest laps in their respective classes, with McNish's time of 1:25.2189 being the fastest ever non-Formula One race lap of the Adelaide circuit (compared to the outright lap record of 1:15.381 set by Damon Hill in a Williams FW15C-Renault during the 1993 Australian Grand Prix).

Top 10 Qualifiers

Official results
Class winners in bold.

† – No. 2 Panoz was disqualified for allowing an unassigned driver, Klaus Graf, to drive the car during the race.

Statistics
 Pole Position – Rinaldo Capello – No. 77 Audi Sport North America – 1:23.804
 Fastest Lap – Allan McNish – No. 77 Audi Sport North America – 1:25.219
 Average Speed – 148.048 km/h

References

Auto Action, 12–18 January 2001
Official Program, Adelaide Race of a Thousand Years, 29–31 December 2000

External links
 Official results, www.imsaracing.net, as archived at web.archive.org
 www.lemansadelaide.com.au, as archived at web.archive.org

2000 in Australian motorsport
2000 American Le Mans Series
Auto races in Australia
New Year celebrations
Motorsport in Adelaide